Air Commodore Jack Broughton,  is a retired senior Royal Air Force officer. A navigator, he obtained senior rank in the 1970s and 1980s and was Commandant Royal Observer Corps from 1984 to 1986. Broughton was the Station Commander of RAF West Drayton from 1978 to 1980.

References

|-

Living people
Officers of the Order of the British Empire
People of the Royal Observer Corps
Royal Air Force air commodores
Year of birth missing (living people)
Deputy Lieutenants of Merseyside